On 25 May 2022, armed assailants suspected to be jihadists attacked the rural locality of Madjoari in the Kompienga Province of Burkina Faso. The massacre left at least 50 civilians dead as they were attempting to flee a blockade. It was the third attack to take place in Madjoari in May 2022, after an attack on 14 May that killed 17 civilians and another on 19 May that killed 11 soldiers. It is also the deadliest attack in Burkina Faso since the Solhan and Tadaryat massacres, which killed 174 people.

Background

Since 2015, Burkina Faso has been fighting jihadists linked to the Islamic State and al-Qaeda in some parts of the country. Civilians and soldiers in northern and eastern Burkina Faso are regularly attacked by the militants. Over 2,000 people have been killed and 1.8 million displaced. In January 2022, President Roch Marc Christian Kaboré was ousted in a military coup because of his lack of effort in managing the deteriorating security situation and in combating Islamist insurgents.

Attack
On 25 May 2022, at least 50 civilians were shot dead in Madjoari, which was occupied by jihadists. Witnesses at the scene said that residents were trying to flee the blockaded area after having been deprived of supplies for a week, and that all the dead were men. The wounded were evacuated to Diapaga for treatment.

Colonel Hubert Yameogo, the governor of the region, said that the massacre was carried out by "unidentified armed individuals" suspected to be jihadists.

Reactions
The killing was condemned by UN Secretary-General António Guterres, whose spokesman issued a statement expressing Guterres's condolences to the families of the victims and reaffirming the United Nations' commitment to aiding Burkina Faso in managing the country's security situation.

The Egyptian Foreign Ministry also condemned the killing and reaffirmed Egypt's "full solidarity" with Burkina Faso in its effort to combat the terrorist groups.

References

2022 in Burkina Faso
2022 mass shootings in Africa
2022 murders in Burkina Faso
21st-century mass murder in Burkina Faso
Islamic terrorist incidents in 2022
Jihadist insurgency in Burkina Faso
Kompienga Province
Massacres in 2022
Massacres in Burkina Faso
May 2022 crimes in Africa
Terrorist incidents in Africa in 2022
Terrorist incidents in Burkina Faso in the 2020s